Lesbian, gay, bisexual, and transgender (LGBT) persons in Somaliland face legal challenges not experienced by non-LGBT residents. Somaliland has been Muslim majority nation with harsh societal rules. It is dangerous for LGBT people and face up to death penality. Besides, extrajudicial killings, mob lynching used as an instrument for punishing homosexuals. Somaliland does not recognize same-sex activity abroad.

Law regarding same-sex sexual activity

Ottoman Empire

In 1858, the Ottoman Empire legalised same-sex sexual intercourse.

Italian East Africa

In 1940, Italy conquered British Somaliland and annexed it into the Italian East Africa. While Italy did not have sodomy laws since 1890, the Fascist authorities still punished homosexuals. In 1941, the British reconquered British Somaliland and re-instated their sodomy laws.

British Somaliland

Prior to independence from the British, the Indian Penal Code of 1860 was applied in British Somaliland.

Somali Republic

In 1964, a new penal code came into force in the Somali Republic. The code states that "Whoever has carnal intercourse with a person of the same sex shall be punished, where the act does not constitute a more serious crime, with imprisonment from three months to three years. Where the act committed is an act of lust different from carnal intercourse, the punishment imposed shall be reduced by one-third. The code has since been abolished by the United Kingdom after seeing it as one of the most discriminating laws crafted by a former world power. The United Kingdom has since then legalised homosexuality, civil partnership, and same-sex marriage.

Somaliland

In 1991, Somaliland declared independence. Somaliland continues to apply the 1964 penal code in the country. The non-abolishment of the code is one of the reasons, noted by European scholars, why some advanced European countries won't recognize Somaliland independence.

There are life threatening-events or death sentences in Somaliland and Somalia for LGBT people.

Recognition of same-sex relationships

Somaliland does not recognise same-sex marriage, domestic partnerships, or civil unions.

Summary table

See also

LGBT rights in Somalia
LGBT rights in Africa

References

Somaliland
LGBT in Somalia
Law of Somaliland
Society of Somaliland